The 1930/31 National Championship (Serbo-Croato-Slovenian: Državno prvenstvo 1930/31 / Државно првенство 1930/31) begun shortly after the previous season and was now contested during autumn and continuing through the next year ending in spring. BSK Beograd ended the Zagreb clubs' streak with record stats and an undefeated season.

Jugoslavija Beograd didn't qualify for the Državno prvenstvo.

League table

Results

Winning squad
Champions:

BSK Belgrade (coach: Antal Nemes)

Otmar Gazzari
Predrag Radovanović
Dragomir Tošić
Milorad Arsenijević
Đorđe Popović
Miodrag Jovanović
Ljubiša Đorđević
Aleksandar Tirnanić
Svetislav Glišović
Blagoje Marjanović
Nikola Marjanović
Đorđe Vujadinović
Dragoslav Virić
Predrag Antić

Top scorers
Final goalscoring position, number of goals, player/players and club.
1 - 12 goals - Đorđe Vujadinović (BSK Belgrade)
2 - 7 goals - Blagoje Marjanović (BSK Belgrade)
3 - 6 goals - Aleksandar Tirnanić (BSK Belgrade), Mirko Kokotović (Građanski Zagreb)

See also
Yugoslav Cup
Yugoslav League Championship
Football Association of Yugoslavia

References

External links
Yugoslavia Domestic Football Full Tables

Yugoslav Football Championship
Yugo
1930–31 in Yugoslav football